Bonda Umamaheswara Rao  is an Indian politician and an ex-member of the Andhra Pradesh Legislative Assembly for Vijayawada Central constituency. He is polit bureau member of the Telugu Desam Party and TTD Board Member.

Biography

Early life
Bonda Umamaheswara Rao was born to Sri. Kanaka Rao and Smt. Pushpavathi at Vijayawada, Krishna district, Andhra Pradesh, India on 30 Jan 1966. Bonda Umamaheswara Rao is married to Sujatha. The couple has two children.

Political
Uma began his political career as a party worker (Karya Kartha) of the Telugu Desam Party and rose to the ranks of the state general secretary. He was elected MLA of the Vijayawada Central constituency, that consists of more than 5 lakh members and is a prominent and a distinct leader in the statevidual Uma Maheshwara Rao, has gained tremendous support from amongst the youth, women and the poor owing to his pragmatic policies and commitment to the party's core ideology.

For about a decade Uma has been earnestly devoted to the TDP party and is perceived to be a noble and a dynamic Leader serving to be of an inspiration to the youth. Having joined the party in 2005, Uma is as enthusiastic and vigorous as he was and is the one who seeks to build the party from the grass root level.

Having played a key role in all the ranks and movements of his political career, it was Uma's intrepid nature and fearless attitude that helped him to work with great zeal and vigour in addressing issues that were affecting the common man. Inspiring through his social activities Mr. Bonda was greatly inspired from the leader and founder of the Telugu Desam Party (TDP), Sri N. T. Rama Rao and Swami Vivekananda.

Uma passionately supports the Telugu Desam Party (TDP)’s goals of National Integrity and was intrinsically associated with a number of social, cultural and philanthropic organisations ever since his school days.

He participated in a variety of constructive programs aimed at poverty alleviation among targeted groups, extending help to the needy and building awareness among people about social, political, economic and legal issues. Uma also actively participated in rescue and rehabilitation programs to help the victims of cyclone and floods.

Positions held
 Telugu Desam PartyTDP polit bureau member
 State Telugu Desam Party General Secretary
 TTD board member

Legislative Assembly

 2014 : Elected from Vijayawada Central constituency

References

Living people
Telugu Desam Party politicians
Politicians from Vijayawada
1966 births
Andhra Pradesh MLAs 2014–2019